Solution .45 is a heavy metal supergroup from Sweden, created by guitarist Jani Stefanovic (Miseration, Divinefire, Essence of Sorrow). Their current lineup includes vocalist Christian Älvestam (Miseration, ex-Scar Symmetry), guitarists Stefanovic and Patrik Gardberg (Divinefire, Torchbearer, The Few Against Many, Ammotrack), drummer Rolf Pilve (Miseration, Essence of Sorrow, Stratovarius), and bassist Henric Liljesand (The Unguided, Cipher System, Night Crowned, Nightrage, Dead by April)

History
In late 2007 Jani Stefanovic formed Solution .45, with Christian Älvestam (who had left Scar Symmetry in 2008) joining as one of its last members.  Jani stresses that despite Christian's presence in the band, it will not be a Scar Symmetry clone and that songs had been ready for some time before his arrival.  In the fall of 2008 an 8-track demo was produced by Tomas "Plec" Johansson (Unmoored, Scar Symmetry), with a demo track titled "Clandestinity Now" available over the internet.

Solution .45 entered Panic Room Studios in September 2009 to record its first full-length album For Aeons Past, with Dark Tranquillity vocalist Mikael Stanne writing lyrics for the majority of the album. The record was finished and mastered in December 2009, and was issued by AFM records in Europe and Marquee/Avalon in Japan; released on 9 April 2010 in Europe, and 11 May in North America.

On 23 January 2010, it was announced that the band was parting ways with keyboardist Mikko Härkin. Mikko still contributed keyboards to the record, but he is regarded as a guest musician on the album, rather than a permanent band member.  Furthermore, it was announced on 29 May 2010 that Jani Stefanovic was leaving the band amicably, and Patrik Gardberg (from Torchbearer, The Few Against Many, and Ammotrack) would be his replacement.  The band still wishes to involve Jani in future work, including future albums.

By 25 August 2010, Solution .45 had released a music video for "Gravitational Lensing". The video for "Lethean Tears" was released on 30 July 2011.

On 11 August 2011, it was announced that Stefanovic had returned to the band, which would now feature three guitarists (Stefanovic, Gardiner, and Gardberg). It has since been announced that Anders Edlund, the groups bassist, has departed from the group on mutual terms.

As of mid-2014, the group is working on their second and third studio albums.
On 9 July 2014, the band announced that Tom Gardiner had left the band

On 31 August 2015, on the official Facebook page, the band announced 20 November 2015 as the release date of Part 1 of their new album, which will be released worldwide through vinyl, CD and most digital platforms. The album was later titled Nightmares In The Waking State: Part I. Following the release of Part I, Nightmares in the Waking State: Part II was released in August 2016.

Members
Current
 Christian Älvestam - Vocals, Keyboards (2007-2017, 2019–present) (Miseration, The Few Against Many, ex-Scar Symmetry)
 Jani Stefanovic - Guitars (2007-2010, 2011-2017, 2019-present), Keyboards (2011-2017, 2019–present) (Miseration, Divinefire, Essence of Sorrow, The Few Against Many)
 Patrik Gardberg - Guitars (lead, rhythm), Keyboards (2010-2016, 2023-present) (Divinefire, Torchbearer, The Few Against Many, Ammotrack)
 Rolf Pilve - Drums (2007-2017, 2019–present) (Miseration, Essence of Sorrow, Stratovarius)
 Henric Liljesand - bass guitar (2023-present) (The Unguided, Cipher System, Night Crowned, Nightrage, Dead by April)

Former
 Mikko Härkin - Keyboards (2007-2010) (Symfonia, Kotipelto, ex-Sonata Arctica, Mehida)
 Anders Edlund - Bass (2007-2012) (Angel Blake, The Few Against Many)
 Tom "Tomma" Gardiner - Guitars (2007-2014) (Hateform, ex-Mors Principium Est)
 Ronnie Björnström - Guitars (2016-2017, 2019–2023) (Defiatory, Ill-Wisher, Taedeat, ex-Aeon)

Timeline

Discography
 For Aeons Past (2010)
 Nightmares in the Waking State: Part I (2015)
 Nightmares in the Waking State: Part II (2016)

References

External links
 Solution .45 at MySpace

Swedish melodic death metal musical groups
Heavy metal supergroups
Swedish progressive metal musical groups
Swedish technical death metal musical groups
Swedish power metal musical groups
Finnish melodic death metal musical groups
Finnish progressive metal musical groups
Finnish power metal musical groups
Djent
Musical groups established in 2008